The Scottish Junior Football East Region Premier League South  also known for sponsorship reasons as the McBookie.com East Premier League South, was the second-tier division of the East Region of the Scottish Junior Football Association and sat parallel with the East Region Premier League North.

The league came into existence under the 'South' name for the 2006–07 season, although a 'Lothian District league' had been in place below the East Super League since 2002–03, using the structure of a common 'East Region' top tier and lower regional divisions in place of the old structure of three separate regional leagues in that part of Scotland, with the East Junior Football League the historic Lothians competition. The South Division was expanded for the start of the 2013–14 season by absorbing the more southerly clubs from the dissolved East Region Central Division as part of league reconstruction in the region.

Between 2006–07 and 2017–18, there was an East Premier League at tier 2 and North and South Divisions at tier 3. The large-scale movement of clubs to the East of Scotland League resulted in the structure being flattened into two tiers. Further league reconstruction for the 2019–20 season split the Super League into North and South divisions, reducing the number of Premier League South teams. For the final season it comprised 10 clubs who were due to play each other three times to give 27 league fixtures prior to the season being cancelled due to the COVID-19 pandemic.

Final Members

Winners

As Lothians District, one of three third-tier divisions:
2002–03: Bo'ness United
2003–04: Camelon Juniors
2004–05: Whitburn
2005–06: Camelon Juniors (2)
As East Region South, one of three third-tier divisions:
2006–07: Newtongrange Star
2007–08: Fauldhouse United
2008–09: Armadale Thistle
2009–10: Broxburn Athletic
2010–11: Sauchie
2011–12: Dalkeith Thistle
2012–13: Fauldhouse United (2)
As one of two third-tier divisions:
2013–14: Edinburgh United
2014–15: Haddington Athletic
2015–16: Tranent
2016–17: Dunbar United
2017–18: Pumpherston
As one of two second-tier divisions:
2018–19: Pumpherston (2)
2019–20: No champion

References

External links
East Region South Division at Non-League Scotland (archive version, 2007-08 membership)
 Premier League South table at East Region SJFA

3
Sports leagues established in 2002
2002 establishments in Scotland
Sports leagues disestablished in 2020
2020 disestablishments in Scotland
Football in Fife
Football in West Lothian
Football in Falkirk (council area)
Football in Clackmannanshire
Football in Edinburgh
Football in East Lothian
Football in Midlothian